The Independence Institute (II) is a libertarian think tank based in Denver, Colorado. The group's stated mission "is to empower individuals and to educate citizens, legislators and opinion makers about public policies that enhance personal and economic freedom."

History
The Independence Institute was founded in 1985 by John Andrews, a former Republican state legislator from Colorado. Since 1999, Independence Institute has been led by Jon Caldara.

Policy positions
The Independence Institute is a proponent of educational choice and charter schools, as well as the right to bear arms in accordance with the Second Amendment. II supported school board members in Douglas County, Colorado who became the majority there in 2009 and subsequently curtailed the power of the teacher's union, expanded school choice, and attempted to initiate a voucher system.  However, a new school board majority elected in 2017 has promised to reverse many of these policies.

Prior to winning election to the United States House of Representatives as a Democrat, Jared Polis wrote a white paper for the institute about privatizing the U.S. Postal Service.

Because of the Institute's pro Second Amendment stance, it supports gun rights, including the right of concealed carry.

In 2013, II opposed Amendment 66, an unsuccessful ballot measure which would have increased the state's income tax by $950 million (which would have begun the hollowing out of Colorado's Taxpayer Bill of Rights (TABOR)). The organization supported the Taxpayer Bill of Rights (TABOR), which was passed by Colorado voters in 1992.

II opposed the Affordable Care Act. The Institute supports the use of fossil fuels.

See also

 State Policy Network – a U.S. national network of conservative and libertarian think tanks of which the Independence Institute is a member
 Political activities of the Koch brothers

References

External links
 Official website
 Organizational Profile – National Center for Charitable Statistics (Urban Institute)
 EDIRC listing (provided by RePEc)

Think tanks established in 1985
Political and economic think tanks in the United States
Libertarian think tanks
Libertarian organizations based in the United States
1985 establishments in Colorado